Nivå station is a railway station serving the suburb of Nivå on the coast of North Zealand north of central Copenhagen, Denmark, as well as the nearby Nivaagaard Art Gallery.

The station is located on the Coast Line between Helsingør and Copenhagen. The train services are currently operated by Danish State Railways (DSB) which runs a frequent regional rail service to Copenhagen Central Station.

The station was designed by Heinrich Wenck in the National Romantic style which characterize most of the stations along the line.

Description
There is an underpass under the tracks at the southern end of the station and a bus stop on its west side.

See also
 List of railway stations in Denmark

References

External links

DSB Øresund's website

Coast Line (Denmark)
Railway stations in the Capital Region of Denmark
Buildings and structures in Fredensborg Municipality
National Romantic architecture in Denmark
Art Nouveau railway stations
Railway stations opened in 1897
Railway stations in the Øresund Region
Railway stations in Denmark opened in the 19th century